Maurizio Pugliesi (born 27 December 1976) is a former Italian footballer who played as a goalkeeper.

Pugliesi made his Serie A debut on 15 May 2016 against Torino at the age of 39 making him the oldest debutant in the Italian top flight, beating the record set by Amílcar Barbuy.

He is currently Pisa SC's goalkeepers coach.

References

Italian footballers
Serie A players
Serie B players
1976 births
Living people
U.S. Città di Pontedera players
Delfino Pescara 1936 players
U.S. Poggibonsi players
Rimini F.C. 1912 players
Pisa S.C. players
Empoli F.C. players
Association football goalkeepers